Suba may refer to:

Groups of people
Suba people (Kenya), a people of Kenya
Suba language
Suba people (Tanzania), a people of Tanzania
Subha (writers), alternatively spelt Suba, Indian writer duo

Individual people
Suba (musician), Serbian-Brazilian musician
Mihai Suba (born 1947), Romanian chess grandmaster
 Miklos Suba (1880-1944), Hungarian-born American artist and architect
 Susanne Suba (1913-2012), Hungarian-born watercolorist and illustrator, active in the United States; daughter of Miklos

Places 
 Suba District, a former district of Nyanza Province, Kenya
 Suba, Bogotá, a locality of Bogotá
 Avenida Suba (Bogotá), main avenue in the city, named after the locality
 Suba, Jerusalem, a Palestinian village near Jerusalem depopulated in 1948

Other
 Suba (film), a 2010 Sri Lankan Sinhala drama film
 Okinawa soba

See also

Subah (disambiguation)
 Subba (disambiguation)

Language and nationality disambiguation pages